Jarosław Guzy (born December 31, 1955, in Kraków) is a Polish politician and businessman, first chairman of the Independent Students Union.

From 1975 to 1981, Guzy studied sociology at the Jagiellonian University, cooperating in late 1970s with oppositional organization Student Committee of Solidarity. In 1980, he became a member of the Independent Students Union, and in April 1981, was elected first chairman of the Union. During the martial law in Poland, Guzy, together with wife Agnieszka, was interned in prisons in Białołęka and Darłówko. After his release, he was under constant surveillance of the Communist secret services, Służba Bezpieczeństwa.

In 1988 Guzy left Poland for the United States, where he studied at the Yale University. In 1991, he returned to Poland, and became actively engaged in politics. Guzy has been employed by several government-owned enterprises, such as Warsaw Park of Technology. On December 8, 2007, President Lech Kaczyński awarded him the Knight's Cross of the Order of Polonia Restituta.

1955 births
Living people
Businesspeople from Kraków
Politicians from Kraków
Jagiellonian University alumni
Polish expatriates in the United States
Knights of the Order of Polonia Restituta